Bursera hollickii is a species of plant in the Burseraceae family. It is endemic to Jamaica, and listed as critically endangered.

Bursera hollickii is a tree up to 6 meters tall with a trunk up to 25 cm in diameter. Bark is reddish-gray outside, red inside. Leaves are up to 12 cm long, clustered at the ends of twigs, thick and leathery with 3-7 leaflets. Flowers are in elongated racemes.

References

Plants described in 1908
hollickii
Endangered plants
Taxonomy articles created by Polbot

Critically endangered flora of North America